Dichomeris fistuca is a moth in the family Gelechiidae. It was described by Ronald W. Hodges in 1986. It is found in North America, where it has been recorded from South Carolina, North Carolina, Georgia and Florida.

References

Moths described in 1986
fistuca